Eurybunus is a genus of harvestmen in the family Sclerosomatidae from the Western United States.

Species
 Eurybunus brunneus Banks, 1893
 Eurybunus pallidus C.J.Goodnight & M.L.Goodnight, 1943
 Eurybunus riversi C.J.Goodnight & M.L.Goodnight, 1943
 Eurybunus spinosus Banks, 1895

References

Harvestmen
Harvestman genera